Massive Assault Network 2 is a massively multiplayer online game published by Wargaming.  The game is a turn-based futuristic military simulation.  The game is science fiction and takes place in the future, with the Free States Union vying for power against the Phantom League.  Opponents square off against each other on a particular planet and fight to control all of its nations.  Each player is given secret ally nations, and each nation has a limited amount of resources for building units.  The game comes in both a free and subscription version.  The free version provides full unit set and one level, where the subscription version provides access to several levels.

References

External links
 Official Website
 Massive Assault Network 2 at MobyGames
 Russian video-review with gameplay on YouTube

2006 video games
Massively multiplayer online games
Turn-based tactics video games
Windows games
Windows-only games
Wargaming.net games
Video games developed in Belarus